Palmier is a surname. Notable people with the surname include:
 Remo Palmier (1923-2002), American jazz guitarist
 Pierre Palmier (d. 1555), archbishop of Vienne 
 Jean-Michel Palmier (1944–1998), French philosopher and art historian
 Leslie Hugh Palmier (b. 1924), British sociologist

See also
 Palmieri (surname)